In enzymology, a formyltetrahydrofolate deformylase is an enzyme that catalyzes the chemical reaction

10-formyltetrahydrofolate + H2O  formate + tetrahydrofolate

Thus, the two substrates of this enzyme are 10-formyltetrahydrofolate and H2O, whereas its two products are formate and tetrahydrofolate.

This enzyme belongs to the family of hydrolases, those acting on carbon-nitrogen bonds other than peptide bonds, specifically in linear amides.  The systematic name of this enzyme class is 10-formyltetrahydrofolate amidohydrolase. This enzyme participates in glyoxylate and dicarboxylate metabolism and one carbon pool by folate.

References 

 

EC 3.5.1
Enzymes of unknown structure